Keepmoat Homes Ltd is a housebuilding company in the United Kingdom that provides private homes for sale. Its headquarters are in Doncaster.

History
The company was founded in Rotherham by George Bramall and Dick Ogden as Bramall & Ogden in 1931. It acquired Frank Haslam Milan (founded in Doncaster 1928) in 1983 and changed the name of the combined business to Keepmoat.

Keepmoat bought Milnerbuild, a Leeds-based social housing repair and maintenance company, in 2010, and, in 2012, Keepmoat completed a merger with social housing provider Apollo.

In 2014, Keepmoat was acquired by two London-based private equity firms, TDR Capital and Sun Capital Partners (UK).

In February 2017, Keepmoat sold its regeneration business, employing 2,500 people, to ENGIE for £330m.

In 2018, Keepmoat was hit by a £13.2m loss from its West Midlands sites, which prompted the company to close its offices in that area. The problems hit the company’s overall operating profits, which slid 35.4% to £18.2m in the 12 months to the end of March 2018.

In 2019, the company sold 4,035 homes - 1.2 per cent more than the previous 12 months.

In July 2021, Terra Firma Capital Partners was reported to be bidding £700m to buy Keepmoat with a view to combining it with its former Kier Living business. Terra Firma purchased Kier Living, the housing arm of the Kier Group, for £110m in April 2021, rebranding it as Tilia Homes in June 2021.

In late 2021 Aermont Capital completed the purchase of Keepmoat Homes from Sun Capital Partners (UK) and TDR Capital for £700m.

Flagship developments
The company's flagship developments include:
Sighthill, Glasgow: The development, which is part of the Sighthill Transformational Regeneration Area, the largest project of its kind outside of London, will feature 824 new homes when it is completed.
Chase Farm, Gedling: Keepmoat Homes is involved in the creation of thousands of new homes in the Borough of Gedling. Chase Farm is the largest of the borough's planned new developments, with more than 1,000 homes to be built. The land, next to the 240-acre Gedling Country Park, was sold to Keepmoat in 2015.
Waterside, Leicester: Keepmoat Homes is helping to transform an underused stretch of the Grand Union Canal and creating a new neighbourhood, close to the city.

Sponsorship
Keepmoat was the main sponsor of the Keepmoat Stadium in Doncaster from 2006 to late 2021 .

References

External links

Construction and civil engineering companies of the United Kingdom
Housebuilding companies of the United Kingdom
Companies based in Doncaster
2014 mergers and acquisitions
1931 establishments in England
Construction and civil engineering companies established in 1931
British companies established in 1931